This article is a list of domestic and international charities operating in China.

List

Habitat for Humanity China
Heart to Heart Community Care
Heifer International
Jane Goodall Institute China
Love Without Boundaries
One Foundation
Operation Smile
Red Cross Society of China
Rotary Club of Shanghai
Smile Angel Foundation
SOS Children's Villages
The Smile Train
UNICEF
Wheelchair Foundation

See also

Charitable contribution
Charitable organization
Charity fraud
List of non-governmental organizations in the People's Republic of China

References

External links

Organizations
China Charity Federation

Articles and resources
China Development Brief – News on social development and civil society in China
Report on China's Tax Rules For Not-For-Profit Organizations
The World Bank and NGOs in China – In-depth Chinese NGO information by the World Bank

Lists of organizations based in China